Verkhnekansiyarovo (Ürge Qanhöyär) is a rural locality (a village) in Tuchubayevsky Selsoviet, Baltachevsky District, Bashkortostan, Russia. The population was 211 as of 2010. There are 7 streets.

Geography 
Verkhnekansiyarovo is located 21 km west of Starobaltachevo (the district's administrative centre) by road. Nizhnekansiyarovo is the nearest rural locality.

References 

Rural localities in Baltachevsky District